The University of Florida is the flagship university in the State University System of Florida and has many notable buildings located in cities including Gainesville, Jacksonville, and Orlando. The Campus Historic District at the University of Florida comprises 32 contributing properties that are registered with the National Register of Historic Places. As is typical in the United States, most of the university's oldest buildings were designed in the Collegiate Gothic architectural style; since the 1950s, Brutalist and Modern styles have been extensively employed. The university has over 900 buildings on the main campus (about 170 have classrooms).

The University of Florida campus encompasses over 2,000 acres (8.1 km²). The campus is home to many notable structures, including Century Tower, a  carillon tower in the center of the campus historic district.

Buildings and Historic photos

Notes

Buildings under construction

References

External links
 List of construction projects
 University of Florida Campus Map

See also
 University of Florida
 University of Florida Campus Historic District
 University of Florida student housing

Education in Gainesville, Florida

Florida, University of
University of Florida
Buildings